Harold "Hal" Ray Wing  founded Wing Enterprises in Springville, Utah. Wing Enterprises was established in 1972, originally operating out of Wing's carport. The company's main product is the Little Giant Ladder System. Hal became mayor of Springville in 1997.

In 1986, President Ronald Reagan invited Wing to serve as a representative at the White House Conference of Small Businesses in Washington, D.C.

In 1995, Wing was named one of Ernst & Young's "Entrepreneurs of the Year" in Utah.

Personal life
Wing and his wife Brigitte are parents of eight children, three of whom are adopted. Wing's eldest son, Arthur, is the current president of Wing Enterprises. Another son, Douglas, is executive vice president of the company.

References

Citations

General references

"Harold Wing Obituary (2012)" - The Salt Lake Tribune

External links
Little Giant Ladders Website.

American manufacturing businesspeople
Living people
Year of birth missing (living people)